Samuel Darpoh (born 15 March 1998) is a Ghanaian professional footballer who plays as a midfielder for South African side Venda. He played youth football with Okwawu United, before joining AmaZulu as a young player. He made his debut for the club on 28 August 2016 in a 2–1 victory at home to Black Leopards. He is the cousin of fellow Ghanaian footballer John Arwuah.

References

1998 births
Living people
Ghanaian footballers
Association football midfielders
AmaZulu F.C. players
National First Division players
South African Premier Division players
Ghanaian expatriate footballers
Expatriate soccer players in South Africa
Ghanaian expatriate sportspeople in South Africa